Batèë Iliëk is a town in the Samalanga region, on the north coast of Aceh. Batèë Iliëk was an important stronghold  during the Aceh War, which was impregnable until February 3, 1901.  It was an important spiritual center and recruitment center for guerrilla fighters.

Sources
1900. W.A. Terwogt. Het land van Jan Pieterszoon Coen. Geschiedenis van de Nederlanders in oost-Indië. P. Geerts, Hoorn.
1902. G. Kepper. Wapenfeiten van het Nederlands Indische Leger; 1816-1900. M.M. Cuvee, The Hague.

Aceh War
Dutch East Indies